Lukáš Urbanič (born 15 December 1998) is a Slovak footballer who plays for as a midfielder, on loan from FK Poprad.

Club career

FK Železiarne Podbrezová
Urbanič made his professional debut for FK Železiarne Podbrezová against FC Nitra on February 16, 2019.

References

External links
 FK Železiarne Podbrezová official club profile 
 
 Futbalnet profile 
 

1998 births
Living people
Slovak footballers
Association football midfielders
FK Poprad players
FK Železiarne Podbrezová players
Slovak Super Liga players
2. Liga (Slovakia) players